The 1360s BC is a decade which lasted from 1369 BC to 1360 BC.

Events and trends

Significant people
1368 BC—Death of Erichthonius, mythical King of Dardania.
1366 BC—Birth of Princess Tadukhipa to  Tusratta, King of Mitanni and his Queen Juni. She will be later married to Amenhotep III and after his death to his son and heir Amenhotep IV Akhenaton. She is variously identified with Akhenaton's Queens Nefertiti and Kiya.
1365 BC—Ashur-uballit I rises to the throne on Assyria.
c. 1365 BC—The Citadel of Tiryns, Greece, is built.
1362 BC—Birth of the later Pharaoh Amenhotep IV Akhenaton to Amenhotep III and his Queen Tiy.

References